Teo Shun Xie (born 30 September 1988) is a Singaporean sport shooter. In 2014, Teo set a final meet record in the women's air pistol to claim her first gold medal at the Commonwealth Games.

Teo trains for the Singaporean national team under coach Anatoly Babushkin.

Teo made her international debut at the 2013 Southeast Asian Games in Naypyidaw, Myanmar, claiming the silver medal in the women's 10 m air pistol. Teo's success in marksmanship came at the Commonwealth Games in Glasgow, Scotland by the following year. There, she notched the final Games record score of 198.6 points ahead of India's Malaika Goel and Canada's 2012 Olympian Dorothy Ludwig to win her first gold medal in the women's air pistol.

When Singapore hosted the 2015 Southeast Asian Games, Teo scored 199.0 in the air pistol final by a 2.3-point lead over Thailand's Pim-on Klaisuban to win the gold medal.

Leading up to her Olympic debut, Teo had finished sixth with 12 points in the semifinal stage of the women's sport pistol (25 m), but managed to secure one of the available berths to the Games for Singapore at the 2016 Asian Olympic Shooting Qualifying Tournament in New Delhi, India.

At the Rio Olympics 2016, she clinched the 37th place for the 10m Women's Air Pistol event and 29th place for the 25m Women's Air Pistol event.

In 2022, Teo won the women's 25m pistol event at the International Shooting Sport Federation (ISSF) Grand Prix held at Jakarta, Indonesia.

References

External links
 

1988 births
Living people
Catholic Junior College alumni
Singaporean female sport shooters
Shooters at the 2014 Commonwealth Games
Commonwealth Games gold medallists for Singapore
Shooters at the 2014 Asian Games
Olympic shooters of Singapore
Shooters at the 2016 Summer Olympics
Commonwealth Games medallists in shooting
Asian Games competitors for Singapore
Competitors at the 2015 Southeast Asian Games
Competitors at the 2019 Southeast Asian Games
Southeast Asian Games medalists in shooting
Southeast Asian Games gold medalists for Singapore
Southeast Asian Games bronze medalists for Singapore
Medallists at the 2014 Commonwealth Games